Lambertseter stadion is a multi-purpose stadium in the Oslo borough of Nordstrand. It is currently used by the football team Manglerud Star for their home games.

The pitch surrounded by a running track, Lambertseter stadion was used as the main track and field stadium in Oslo while Bislett stadion was renovated in 2004.

The stadium has a small clubhouse/changing area, and some good floodlights. There is no seating, and only a small area of terracing along one side of the ground.

Photos

Sports venues in Oslo
Football venues in Norway
Athletics (track and field) venues in Norway
Multi-purpose stadiums in Norway
Manglerud Star Toppfotball
Lambertseter